Love Story is a 2020 Bengali  romantic film directed by Rajiv Kumar. The film is produced by Surinder Films, and stars Bonny Sengupta, Rittika Sen, Reshmi Sen, Rajat Ganguly with supporting cast of Supriyo Dutta, Swagata Basu and Buddhadeb Bhattacharya in pivotal roles. The film is remake of 2014 Tamil film Amara Kaaviyam, and it's story revolves around three school friends, who are stuck in a love triangle.

The film was released in theatres on  21 October 2020 during Durga Puja.

Synopsis 
It is the story of three school friends, who are stuck in a love triangle. A misunderstanding helps clear the air as to which two students like each other. It progresses with some sweet romantic moments but soon the story takes an ugly turn when the boy is accused of molesting the girl. How the two lovers survive against all odds  and what happens to their love story, is the premise of the film.

Cast 
 Bonny Sengupta
 Rittika Sen
 Reshmi Sen
 Rajat Ganguly 
 Supriyo Dutta 
 Swagata Basu  
 Buddhadeb Bhattacharya
 Puspendu Roy

Soundtrack

The soundtrack of the film is composed by Savvy and lyrics by Riddhi Barua, Pranjal and Dipangshu Acharya.

References

External links
 

2020 films
2020s Bengali-language films
Bengali-language Indian films
Films postponed due to the COVID-19 pandemic
Indian romance films
Bengali remakes of Tamil films
2020 romance films